Spencer Breslin (born May 18, 1992) is an American musician and actor. Breslin is an older brother of actress Abigail Breslin. Beginning at the age of three, he acted in over 50 commercials. Breslin has appeared in the feature films Disney's The Kid (co-starring at the age of seven with Bruce Willis), The Santa Clause 2 and The Santa Clause 3: The Escape Clause (as Curtis the Elf), Return to Neverland, Zoom, The Cat in the Hat, Raising Helen, The Princess Diaries 2: Royal Engagement, The Shaggy Dog, Harold, The Happening, and Perfect Sisters. His television credits include Teamo Supremo, Stephen King's Storm of the Century, and Law & Order. Films in which he has acted have taken in a worldwide box office of over $1.3 billion.

As of 2016, Breslin was writing songs for and playing in his band Broken Machine and co-hosting the Spencer & Lara's Vomitorium podcast.

Personal life
Breslin was born in New York City New York, to Michael Breslin, a telecommunications consultant of Irish and Austrian-Jewish heritage, and Kim Breslin (née Kim Walsh), a talent manager of predominantly Irish and English heritage. He has two siblings: an older brother Ryan (b. 1985), and a younger sister Abigail (b. 1996), who are also actors. They were raised in the Lower East Side. Breslin and his siblings were homeschooled by their mother and, according to Breslin, were supportive of his decision to pursue acting but they themselves had no interest in show business.

Breslin married Australian activist Grace Tame in 2017. They later divorced on an unknown date.

Acting career

Early years
Breslin was discovered by a talent scout in a New York City playground at the age of three, and proceeded to star in more than 50 commercials for McDonald's, Life cereal, and other products. By age four, he made his TV debut and was a series regular for the three-episode-long 1997 first season of ABC's sitcom Soul Man, in which he played the youngest child of Dan Aykroyd. He later moved on to guest star on several shows including Law & Order, before appearing in the 1999 three-part horror miniseries Stephen King's Storm of the Century.

2000–2004
Breslin made his big leap into film at the age of eight by starring in the 2000 cult fantasy comedy-drama film Disney's The Kid as chubby, good-natured, lovable, and direct 8-year-old Rusty alongside Bruce Willis (who plays the adult, Russ).  Director Jon Turteltaub chose Breslin over thousands of other child actors after a nationwide search. Turteltaub said: "Bruce [Willis] couldn't keep a straight face during [Spencer's] audition. He kept giggling at how wonderful and alive and funny Spencer was." Breslin appreciated the finer things about making a film with Willis: "The coolest things of all were my breaks. I drove golf carts all around the lot. Sometimes I would ride around and just scare people." Turteltaub observed: "There is nothing bratty, nothing spoiled about this kid at all." Breslin introduced child actress Skye McCole Bartusiak, one year his junior, to his co-star when she visited him on the set by shouting: "Bruce, come meet my girlfriend!"

For his role in Disney's The Kid, at the 22nd Young Artist Awards presented by the Young Artist Association Breslin won the 2000 Young Artist Award for Best Performance in a Feature Film by a Young Actor Age Ten or Under. He was also nominated for the 2001 Saturn Award for Best Performance by a Younger Actor awarded by Academy of Science Fiction, Fantasy and Horror Films, and the 2000 YoungStar Award for Best Young Actor in a Comedy Film, presented by The Hollywood Reporter. Film critic A. O. Scott writing for The New York Times observed: "Mr. Willis stands by while a child swipes a movie out of his open palm ... Spencer Breslin, Russ's tubby, cute-but-annoying almost-8-year-old self." CNN correspondent Sherri Sylvester said: "8-year-old Spencer Breslin knows how to deliver a line. Hard to believe that Disney's "The Kid" is his first feature film." Film critic Kenneth Turan wrote in the Los Angeles Times: "Though Rusty was supposed to be 10 in the original script, the filmmakers made him 8 so they could cast Spencer Breslin in the role, and it is not hard to see why.... Breslin is a charming presence, with a variety of woebegone looks and a gift for mimicking his older self." Shirley Sealy wrote in Film Journal International of Breslin: "He's something else... Even an old pro like Bruce Willis sometimes seems totally blown away by the natural comic gifts and spontaneity of his mini co-star... a very talented kid." Entertainment Weekly observed: "children ... will have fun ... by all means ... especially because young Breslin ... is such a natural, funny, unmannered boy." The film grossed  $110 million, and was a financial success.

He played a little boy in the 2000 comedy film Meet the Parents, which had a worldwide gross of $330.4 million, the eighth-highest worldwide gross of that year. Later that year he was Joey in the Disney Channel Original Movie The Ultimate Christmas Present, a comedy, and garnered a 2000 Young Artist Award nomination for Best Performance in a TV Movie (Comedy or Drama) Young Actor Age 10 or Under.

He played whiz-kid Curtis the Elf in the 2002 romantic comedy-drama-fantasy film The Santa Clause 2, marking the first of four films in which he co-starred alongside Tim Allen. The film was a great financial success, raking in $173 million in gross sales, and was the fifth-highest-grossing holiday film ever and the 28th-highest-grossing film worldwide of the year, making $29 million its opening weekend. In 2002 he also appeared in television films such as the 2002 Mom's on Strike, as a pesky younger brother in the 2003 You Wish!, and Ozzie.  He has also been involved in animation films, notably by lending his voice as Cubby in the animated fantasy comedy-drama film Return to Neverland in 2002, for which he was nominated for a 2003 Young Artist Award as Best Performance in a Voice-Over Role at the 24th Young Artist Awards, and as Captain Crandall/Cap in the Disney animated television series Teamo Supremo in 2002–03. The film had a worldwide box office of $109 million.

Breslin then returned to the big screen starring alongside Dakota Fanning and Mike Myers as a cute, messy, troublemaker squabbling brother of Fanning's in the 2003 fantasy comedy film The Cat in the Hat, which was critically panned and grossed $134 million worldwide. Co-star Alec Baldwin and director Bo Welch lauded Breslin for his Snagglepuss-like "horizontal lisp," the New York sound of his voice, and his capacity to convey "every shade of neurosis." Film reviewer Philip Morency wrote: "Spencer Breslin plays the bratty, obnoxious boy. He makes you want to shoot him." Film critic Stephen Hunter, writing for the Washington Post, found Breslin to be "adorable."

Breslin played on-screen siblings with his real-life younger sister Abigail Breslin in the 2004 comedy drama Raising Helen, starring Kate Hudson as their aunt and guardian. The two siblings worked together again in the 2004 romantic comedy The Princess Diaries 2: Royal Engagement, in which Spencer at the age of 12 played a prince and Abigail made a cameo as a girl at an orphanage. The film had a worldwide box office of $122 million.  

In 2004, Spencer Breslin was a regular as a dim-witted 12-year-old on the short-lived CBS sitcom Center of the Universe starring John Goodman. He appeared in the Wonderfalls episode "Lovesick Ass." 

Also in 2004, Breslin was asked to read alongside Alyson Stoner, Dylan and Cole Sprouse, and Hailey Anne Nelson when Dr. Seuss won his Star on the Hollywood Walk of Fame.

2005–2009
Abigail appeared with Spencer once again, in 2006's  The Santa Clause 3: The Escape Clause, in which Spencer reprised his role of Curtis the Elf. At the 28th Young Artist Awards, for his performance in the film Spencer was nominated for the 2007 Young Artist Award for Best Performance in a Feature Film by a Young Ensemble Cast.  In 2006 Breslin also appeared in two other feature films; the superhero action-adventure comedy Zoom, and the comedy The Shaggy Dog (as the pudgy, eager-to-please son of Tim Allen, who turns into a dog). Variety Chief Film Critic Justin Chang noted: "its occasional lump-in-the-throat moments are almost effortlessly achieved, thanks to strong work from [Kristin] Davis and Breslin in particular."  The film made a worldwide gross of $111 million.

At the age of 16, Breslin went on to star as the titular character in 2007's offbeat teen comedy Harold, alongside Cuba Gooding Jr., about a teen who starts prematurely balding at an early age. S. James Snyder, in his review for the New York Sun, wrote: "As played by Mr. Breslin, Harold is an inspired creation, at times a fidgety Woody Allen, at others a brooding George Costanza."  Sheri Linden of The Hollywood Reporter opined: "Breslin nails his old soul's bunion-hobbled, stooped shuffle. He plays well off Gooding...."

Breslin appeared as Josh in M. Night Shyamalan's science fiction doomsday thriller The Happening in 2008 with Mark Wahlberg. The film had a worldwide box office of $163 million.

After 2006, Breslin's acting work dropped substantially, though he continued to work on a semi-regular basis.

2010–present
He lent his voice as Anthony to the 2010 animated 3-D educational sci-fi adventure film Quantum Quest: A Cassini Space Odyssey. In 2010, MTV listed Breslin as one of "The 17 Coolest 17 Year-Olds from Around the World".

Breslin appeared as Max in the 2011 film Born to Race. He then played Jason in the 2012 romantic comedy drama Stuck in Love. Spencer appeared alongside Abigail as Cousin Derek in the 2012 crime drama Perfect Sisters. Breslin also began to work in other aspects of film making, serving as an executive producer on the animated Really Bad Movie! in 2013, as well as writing and directing his own short films.

Breslin starred as computer nerd goofball Isaac in the 2016 horror film Some Kind of Hate, which starred Grace Phipps and Sierra McCormick and played at the Stanley Film Festival, the Fantasia International Film Festival, and FrightFest.

As of July 2016, Breslin was co-hosting the Spencer & Lara's Vomitorium weekly podcast, dedicated to "complaining about the unbearable, insufferable, and aggravating."

Music
Breslin finished recording his folk-indie debut album Labor Day in October 2009; the album was released in August 2012. It was recorded by Ladybug Transistor's Gary Olson, and produced by James William Hindle.

Breslin has founded his own record label, Acadian Recording Company.

As of July 2016, he was writing songs for and playing in his rock 'n roll, indie folk music, punk-type band Broken Machine. Breslin writes all the music that he plays.

Discography

Labor Day

Labor Day is Breslin's debut album, released under his own label, Acadian Recording Co., in August 2012.

Written and composed by sixteen-year-old Breslin, Labor Day was recorded by Gary Olson - known for his engineering work for acts as diverse as Cold Cave, Jens Lekman, and The Essex Green – over three, week-long sessions in Brooklyn from 2008 to 2009. The album was produced by James William Hindle, whose own music has been featured in The O.C., One Tree Hill, and other shows. Musicians featured include, among others, Kevin Barker (Joanna Newsom, Vetiver, and Antony and the Johnsons), Isobel Knowles (Architecture in Helsinki), Kyle Forester (Crystal Stilts), and Eric Farber (Ladybug Transistor). The record also features a spoken word cameo by actor Jesse Eisenberg (The Social Network, The Squid and the Whale).

Track listing

Filmography

Awards and nominations

Breslin won the 2000 Young Artist Award for Best Performance in a Feature Film by a Young Actor Age Ten or Under. He was also nominated for the 2000 Young Artist Award for Best Performance in a TV Movie (Comedy or Drama); Young Actor Age 10 or Under, the 2000 YoungStar Award for Best Young Actor in a Comedy Film, the 2001 Saturn Award for Best Performance by a Younger Actor, the 2003 Young Artist Award as Best Performance in a Voice-Over Role, and the 2007 Young Artist Award for Best Performance in a Feature Film by a Young Ensemble Cast.

List of awards

References

External links
 
 Archive of an instance of Breslin's official website (His official website's domain name is no longer controlled by him)
 Spencer Breslin's Filmography
 2008 video of Spencer Breslin thanking the US Armed Forces for their service

1992 births
20th-century American male actors
21st-century American male actors
American male child actors
American male film actors
American male television actors
American male voice actors
American people of Austrian-Jewish descent
American people of English descent
American people of Irish descent
American podcasters
Living people
Male actors from New York City
People from the Lower East Side